Nikolay Razgonov (Ukrainian: Микола Разгонов, Russian: Николай Разгонов; born 16 January 1964) is a retired Ukrainian sprinter who competed in the 200 metres for the Soviet Union. He is known for winning medals at the 1986 and 1988 European Indoor Championships. In addition, he took part in the 1987 World Indoor Championships.

International competitions

1Did not finish in the semifinals

Personal bests
Outdoor
100 metres – 10.37 (+1.8 m/s, Bryansk 1987)
200 metres – 20.62 (+0.9 m/s, Kiev 1986)
Indoor
60 metres – 6.63 (Moscow 1988)
200 metres – 20.62 (Budapest 1988)

References

All-Athletics profile

1964 births
Living people
Ukrainian male sprinters
Soviet male sprinters
Competitors at the 1986 Goodwill Games